Jew Süss is a 1934 British historical romantic drama film based on Lion Feuchtwanger's 1925 novel Jud Süß, about Joseph Süß Oppenheimer. Directed by Lothar Mendes, the film stars German actor Conrad Veidt in the role of Oppenheimer. The screenplay was written by Dorothy Farnum and Arthur Rawlinson.

Unlike the Nazis' antisemitic film Jud Süß (1940), the British film was intended to be sympathetic to Jews, and is generally considered to be a faithful adaptation of Feuchtwanger's novel. It was hoped the historical analogy, condemning antisemitism in 1730, would be a successful means of evading the ban by the British censors on political  topics in films.

The latter film with the same title, produced in Nazi Germany, is considered by some to be an antisemitic response to Mendes' philosemitic film.

Cast 

 Conrad Veidt as Josef Süss Oppenheimer
 Benita Hume as Marie Auguste
 Frank Vosper as Karl Alexander
 Cedric Hardwicke as Rabbi Gabriel
 Gerald du Maurier as Weissensee
 Paul Graetz as Landauer
 Campbell Gulan as the Prince of Thurn and Taxis
 Pamela Mason as Naomi
 Joan Maude as Magdalen Sibylle
 Percy Parsons as Pflug
 James Raglan as Lord Suffolk
 Sam Livesey as Harprecht
 Dennis Hoey as Dieterle
 Eva Moore as Jantje
 Hay Plumb as Pfaeffle
 Francis L. Sullivan as Remchingen

Release
The film premiered simultaneously at the Tivoli Cinema on the Strand in London and Radio City Music Hall in New York on 4 October 1934, with Prince George and Queen Maria of Romania being the guests of honour at the UK premiere. A blurry telephoto picture of Prince George attending the London premiere was shown for the audience in New York, which – due to the time zone difference – saw the film some five hours later. According to The Times correspondent, "the reproduction was indistinct, but the picture was notable as the first attempt to use a radio photograph (see wirephoto) on the screen". The film was retitled Power for the US release.

References

External links

Two Films About Jud Süss  essay by Edgar Feuchtwanger, nephew of Lion Feuchtwanger

1934 films
1934 romantic drama films
Fiction set in the 18th century
British black-and-white films
British biographical films
Films based on German novels
Films directed by Lothar Mendes
Films set in the 1730s
Films set in Germany
Films shot in London
British romantic drama films
Films scored by Jack Beaver
Films about Jews and Judaism
1930s English-language films
1930s British films